Red Apples is a 1975 Romanian drama film directed by Alexandru Tatos.

Cast 
 Ion Cojar - Mitroi 
 Mircea Diaconu - Mitică Irod
 Carmen Galin - Psychologist 
 Angela Stoenescu - Nurse

References

External links 

1975 drama films
1975 films
Romanian drama films
1970s Romanian-language films